The Mountain River is a tributary of the Mackenzie River in Canada's Northwest Territories. Its source is in the Mackenzie Mountains close to the watershed border with Yukon. It flows eastward, joining the Mackenzie River just south of the Arctic Circle. Wildlife includes caribou, moose, wolf, Dall sheep, grizzly bear, and black bear. It is considered an excellent but difficult wilderness canoeing river.

See also
List of rivers of the Northwest Territories

References

Rivers of the Northwest Territories
Tributaries of the Mackenzie River